Ludwik Benoit (18 July 1920 Wołkowysk, Poland – 4 November 1992, Łódź) was a Polish film and theatre actor.

Biography
Benoit was a graduate of the Actor's Studio Gall in Gdańsk in 1946 and from the National Film School in Łódź. He followed in his father's footsteps, who was also an actor. He took roles in both comedic and dramatic movies, in some cases hindered him somewhat distinctive from other actors. According to critics, the best fell on emotional roles, which showed a whole range of feelings.

He was married to actress . Their son, is also an actor. In 1970, he married again to Jadwiga Jędrzejczak. They have a daughter, Anna Benoit-Kołosko, a Łódź-based radio journalist.

He was buried in the Alley of Merit at the municipal cemetery pits in Łódź (XI quarters, the government 43, grave 1).

1920 births
1992 deaths
People from Vawkavysk
People from Białystok Voivodeship (1919–1939)
Polish male actors
Recipients of the State Award Badge (Poland)
Recipient of the Meritorious Activist of Culture badge